The Fuzhou-class tanker (as designated by NATO) is a class of auxiliary ship in the People's Republic of China's People's Liberation Army Navy (PLAN). They were built from 1964 to 1970. 11 were completed as oil tankers, and seven as water tankers. All were retired by 2015.

References

Sources

Auxiliary ships of the People's Liberation Army Navy
Auxiliary transport ship classes